The 488th Tactical Missile Wing is an inactive United States Air Force unit. It was formed by the consolidation of the 488th Bombardment Group and the 588th Tactical Missile Group in 1985, but has not been active since consolidation.

The 488th Bombardment Group was a United States Army Air Forces heavy bomber operational and replacement training unit that served during World War II. It was last assigned to Third Air Force at MacDill Field, Florida, where it was disbanded on 1 May 1944.

The 588th Tactical Missile Group was a United States Air Force tactical missile training unit that served during the Cold War.  It was last assigned to 4504th Missile Training Wing at Orlando Air Force Base, Florida, where it was inactivated on 15 July 1958.

History

World War II
The 488th Bombardment Group was activated at Geiger Field, Washington in the fall of 1943 with the 840th, 841st, 842d, and 843d Bombardment Squadrons assigned. While the 841st and 842d Squadrons were activated with group headquarters at Geiger, the 840th at Ephrata Army Air Field, Washington and the 843d at Kearney Army Air Field, Nebraska were former antisubmarine units. The group operated as a Boeing B-17 Flying Fortress operational training unit under Second Air Force. The OTU program involved the use of an oversized parent unit to provide cadres to "satellite groups." Toward the end of 1943 Second Air Force prepared to concentrate on Boeing B-29 Superfortress training and Geiger was transferred to Fourth Air Force and became a training base for Aviation Engineer units. The 488th headquarters and all its assigned squadrons were transferred to Third Air Force and moved to MacDill Field, Florida.

At MacDill the group operated as a B-17 replacement training unit. Replacement training units were oversized units which trained aircrews prior to their deployment to combat theaters. However, the Army Air Forces found that standard military units, based on relatively inflexible tables of organization were proving less well adapted to the training mission.  Accordingly, a more functional system was adopted in which each base was organized into a separate numbered unit. This resulted in the 488th, along with other units at MacDill, being disbanded in the spring of 1944 and being replaced by the 317th AAF Base Unit, which assumed the group's mission, personnel, and equipment

Cold War
The 588th Tactical Missile Group was formed as a unit including launch, maintenance and support squadrons which could be deployed together rather than Tactical Air Command's previous practice of organizing independent missile squadrons.  The 588th was part of to Ninth Air Force and its initial components were the 17th Tactical Missile Squadron, the 588th Communications and Guidance Squadron and the 588th Support Squadron.  Initial training included preparation to deploy overseas. However, the 17th Squadron deployed to Pacific Air Forces by itself in early 1958, where it became the nucleus for the 6214th Support Group at Tainan Air Station, Taiwan.

In April the 24th Tactical Missile Squadron was reassigned from the 589th Group to the 588th Group and plans began to deploy to Osan Air Base, South Korea.  The 24th engaged in crew training at Orlando but never received any missiles.  The squadron did, however, deploy to Cape Canaveral Air Force Station and launched TM-61 Matador missiles under the guidance of the 6555th Guided Missile Squadron.  However, when the 588th's personnel deployed, the United States Air Force decided to redesignate two fighter units at Osan instead of replacing them with new missile units.  Deploying personnel and equipment were reassigned to the 58th Fighter-Bomber Group which was reactivated as the 58th Tactical Missile Group; the 310th Tactical Fighter Squadron, which became the 310th Tactical Missile Squadron; or the newly activated 58th Support Squadron and 58th Communications and Guidance Squadron.

In July 1958 the 4504th Wing reorganized and the 588th was inactivated and replaced by the 4504th Tactical Missile Training Squadron and the 4504th Support Squadron, which absorbed its remaining personnel and equipment.

The 488th Bombardment Group and the 588th Tactical Missile Group were consolidated on 31 July 1985 as the 488th Tactical Missile Wing, but the consolidated unit has not been active.

Lineage

 488th Bombardment Group
 Constituted as 488th Bombardment Group (Heavy) on 14 September 1943
 Activated on 1 October 1943
 Disbanded on 1 May 1944
 Reconstituted on 31 July 1985 and consolidated with the 588th Tactical Missile Group as the 488th Tactical Missile Wing

 588th Tactical Missile Group
 Constituted as the 588th Tactical Missile Group
 Activated on 8 January 1957
 Inactivated on 15 July 1958
 Consolidated with the 588th Tactical Missile Group on 31 July 1985 as the 488th Tactical Missile Wing

Assignments
 II Bomber Command, 1 October 1943
 III Bomber Command, 1 November 1943 – 1 May 1944
 4504th Missile Training Wing, 8 January 1957 – 15 July 1958

Components
 840th Bombardment Squadron (later 818th Bombardment Squadron): 1 October 1943 – 1 May 1944
 841st Bombardment Squadron: 1 October 1943 – 1 May 1944
 842d Bombardment Squadron: 1 October 1943 – 1 May 1944
 843d Bombardment Squadron: 1 October 1943 – 1 May 1944
 17th Tactical Missile Squadron, 8 January 1957 – 6 February 1958
 24th Tactical Missile Squadron, 25 April 1958 – 15 July 1958
 588th Communications and Guidance Squadron (Tactical Missile), 8 January 1957 – 15 July 1958
 588th Support Squadron (Tactical Missile), 8 January 1957 – 15 July 1958

Stations
 Geiger Field, Washington, 1 October 1943
 MacDill Field, Florida, 1 November 1943 – 1 May 1944
 Orlando Air Force Base, Florida, 8 January 1957 - 15 July 1958

Aircraft and Missiles
 Boeing B-17 Flying Fortress, 1943-1944
 Martin TM-61 Matador, 1957-1958

References

Notes
 Explanatory notes

 Citations

Bibliography

 
 
 
 

 Further reading
 

Missile wings of the United States Air Force